Benbrook is a town located in the southwestern corner of Tarrant County, Texas, and a suburb of Fort Worth. As of the 2010 United States Census, the population was 21,234, reflecting an increase of 1,026 from the 20,208 counted in the 2000 Census, which had in turn increased by 644 from the 19,564 counted in the 1990 Census.

Geography

Benbrook is a suburb of Fort Worth located at  (32.684658, –97.456692).

The total area is 5.63 percent water, and the primary body of water is Benbrook Lake, formed in 1952 after the construction of Benbrook Dam by the U.S. Army Corps of Engineers, which began in May 1947.

Demographics

2020 census

As of the 2020 United States census, there were 24,520 people, 9,281 households, and 6,030 families residing in the city.

2015
As of the 2015 census, there were 22,144 people and 9,276 households in the city. The racial makeup of the city was 77.1 percent White, 6.7 percent African American, 0.20 percent Native American, 2.2 percent Asian, 0.01 percent Pacific Islander, 0.01 percent from other races, and 2.8 percent from two or more races. 11.0 percent of the population were Hispanic or Latino of any race.

2000 census
As of the census of 2000, there were 20,208 people, 8,599 households, and 5,778 families residing in the city. The population density was 1,764.5 people per square mile (681.4/km2). There were 8,914 housing units at an average density of 778.3 per square mile (300.6/km2). The racial makeup of the city was 88.30 percent White, 4.42 percent African American, 0.50 percent Native American, 2.14 percent Asian, 0.04 percent Pacific Islander, 2.71 percent from other races, and 1.87 percent from two or more races. 6.96 percent of the population were Hispanic or Latino of any race.

Of 8,599 households, 28.5 percent had children under the age of 18 living in them, 56.0 percent were married couples living together, 8.7 percent had a female householder with no husband present, and 32.8 percent were classified as non-families by the U.S. Census Bureau. Individual households made up 28.1 percent of the population, and 7.8 percent of all households had someone living alone who was 65 years of age or older. Of the 8,599 households, 315 consisted of unmarried partners: 251 unmarried opposite sex couples, 50 same-sex male, and 14 same-sex female households. The average household size was 2.33 and the average family size was 2.86.

In the city, the population was spread out: 22.3 percent under the age of 18, 7.6 percent ranging from 18 to 24, 29.8 percent ranging from 25 to 44, 25.7 percent from 45 to 64, and 14.7 percent who were 65 years of age or older. The median age was 39 years. For every 100 females, there were 90.1 males. For every 100 females age 18 and over, there were 87.9 males.

The median income for a household in the city was $50,978, and the median income for a family was $63,529. Males had a median income of $42,270 versus $30,030 for females. The per capita income for the city was $26,781. According to the American Community Survey, carried out by the U.S. Census Bureau, the median income for Texas in 2004 was $41,759. The national median income was $44,684.

As of the 2000 census, 4.4 percent of Benbrook residents fell below the poverty line, while 2.5 percent of families fell below this line, while 12 percent of families headed by females fell below this line. Out of the total population, 4.3 percent of those under the age of 18 and 2.9 percent of those 65 and older were currently living below the poverty line.

Economy

Top employers

According to Benbrook's 2014 Comprehensive Annual Financial Report, the top employers in the city are:

Prohibition and alcohol sales 

In 1949, two years after Benbrook was incorporated as a village, the sale of liquor and beer was made illegal. In 1951, the citizens voted to make taverns illegal. A few years later, in 1954, an election was held to determine the legality of selling alcohol for "off-premises consumption," but there were not enough votes to allow its sale. In 1971, the residents of Benbrook chose to prohibit all alcohol sales, except for beer to be imbibed off-premises.

Education 

The Fort Worth Independent School District oversees Benbrook's public schools.

Two elementary schools, Benbrook Elementary and Westpark Elementary, are located in Benbrook. Waverly Park Elementary and Ridglea Hills Elementary in Fort Worth also serve portions of Benbrook. After completion of their elementary education, Benbrook children proceed to Benbrook Middle-High School. Western Hills High School is also in Benbrook is attended by students living north of I-20.

According to data gathered by the U.S. Census in 2000, a high school diploma was the highest level of educational attainment for 23.7 percent of the population aged 25 or older; the national average was 28.6 percent for this category. Approximately 22.6 percent of residents aged 25 and over had a bachelor's degree, compared to the national average of 15.5 percent, while 7.6 percent had a master's degree and 0.7 percent had earned a Doctoral degree, compared with the national average of 5.9 and 1 percent, respectively.

History of schools 

Fort Worth ISD, over the following two decades, began building new schools in Benbrook.

Benbrook Middle opened in August 2011. Prior to the opening of Benbrook Middle, students attended Monning Middle School or Leonard Sixth Grade Center and then Leonard Middle School.

Fort Worth ISD used a 2007 bond to pay for a combined middle and high school that opened in August 2014. Westpark Elementary will be converted into a middle school, and then a $15.5 million new elementary school will open next door. The new Westpark Elementary opened in August 2016. The renovated former elementary school is expected to open as a middle school summer of 2017. The combined middle and high school will become solely a high school when the converted middle school opens.

References

External links

 City of Benbrook official website
 Fort Worth Independent School District
 Western Hills High School

Dallas–Fort Worth metroplex
Cities in Texas
Cities in Tarrant County, Texas